Inglestone is a locality in the Western Downs Region, Queensland, Australia.

History 
The locality takes its name from early pastoral run in the district, which was later resumed for close settlement. Some holders of the Ingleston run were Samuel Brown, Samuel Hannaford and Mr Munro (1900) who brought in R. Meacle as manager.

Road infrastructure
The Meandarra Talwood Road (State Route 74) runs through from north to south.

References 

Western Downs Region
Localities in Queensland